John Deacle (c. 1664–1723), of Wingrove, Buckinghamshire and Aldermanbury, London, was an English politician who sat in the House of Commons from 1715 to 1722.

Deacle was the only son of Edward Deacle of Tewkesbury, Gloucestershire and his first wife. He became a member of the Drapers Company in 1696. In 1709 he succeeded to his uncle's fortune of £50,000. He was a Director of the  South Sea Company from 1711 to 1712.

Deacle stood for parliament at Aylesbury  at the 1713 general election but was unsuccessful. At the  1715 general election he was returned as Member of Parliament (MP) for both Aylesbury and Evesham and decided to take his seat at Evesham. Some time after March 1715 he married Delicia Woolf, a widow and daughter of Sir Gabriel Roberts, a Turkey merchant. He was an assistant  of the Drapers Company from 1720 to his death and was warden of the Company in the year 1720 to 1721. He was defeated at Evesham at the 1722 general election.

Deacle died of the palsy on 25 October 1723. There were no children from his marriage.

References

1664 births
1723 deaths
18th-century English people
People from Buckinghamshire (before 1974)
British MPs 1715–1722
Members of the Parliament of Great Britain for English constituencies